Georgios Vafeiadis (born 1894, date of death unknown) was a Greek sports shooter. He competed in the 25 m rapid fire pistol event at the 1924 Summer Olympics.

References

External links
 

1894 births
Year of death missing
Greek male sport shooters
Olympic shooters of Greece
Shooters at the 1924 Summer Olympics
Sportspeople from Volos
20th-century Greek people